Dr. Levi Fox OBE, DL, MA, FSA, FRHistS, FRSL (28 August 1914 – 3 September 2006), was an author of numerous articles and books, particularly on topics relating to William Shakespeare and local history.

List

Notes

References

 

Shakespearean scholarship
Bibliographies by writer
Bibliographies of British writers